This is a basic glossary of equestrian terms that includes both technical terminology and jargon developed over the centuries for horses and other equidae, as well as various horse-related concepts.  Where noted, some terms are used only in American English (US), only in British English (UK), or are regional to a particular part of the world, such as Australia (AU).

A

{{defn|1=[[File:Trottinggeldingbeta.jpg|thumb|alt=A horse with a reddish-brown body and black mane and tail, trotting in a lush green pasture|A bay-colored  horse]]
One of the oldest breeds of horse, noted for small size, dished face, erect carriage, high intelligence and lively disposition, from the Arabian Peninsula. Many other breeds contain Arabian bloodlines.}}

B

balk, balking (US, UK) or baulking (UK)
When a horse refuses to move. Multiple causes, including disobedience, fright, and pain or injury. See also napping and "jib"

barefoot, unshod
When a horse does not wear horseshoes.

bearing rein, overcheck or checkrein
A strap running from a horse's back, over the head, to a bit, to prevent the horse from lowering its head beyond a fixed point. Used with harnessed horses.
A riding aid where the rein is applied to the horse's neck on the side towards the turn. Opposite of a neck rein.

bell boot
A type of protective boot worn by a horse.

billet (US), girth strap, girth point (UK)
A leather strap with punched holes, permanently attached in sets of two or three on each side of the tree of a saddle, used to hold and adjust the girth that holds on most types of saddle.  See also latigo.

bit
An object, usually a metal bar, placed into the mouth of a horse, held on by a bridle and used with reins to direct and guide the animal. Occasionally made of other materials, including rubber. May be solid or jointed and may have rollers or other attachments added, usually in the center.

black type
Bold-face type used in advertisements and sales catalogues to distinguish horses that have won or placed in an approved stake race. Winners receive upper case black type; second and third placed finishers have lower case black type.

bloodhorse, blood
A purebred Thoroughbred or Arabian.

blowing, blow
A sound made by a horse by sharply exhaling through flared nostrils.  The blowing sound is not as long or loud as a snort, and may be produced with the head lowered. Most of a sound energy is below 3 kHz and most are audible within 30 metres. Horses may blow when curious, meeting another horse, shying or working. The term is also used when a working horse allowed to pause and catch its breath, or "let him (or her) blow".

blue hen 
A mare who consistently produces high-quality foals, many of whom go on to become champions.  Commonly used in reference to horse racing breeding where mares may be awarded honors such as the Kentucky Broodmare of the Year.

bolting
When a horse suddenly runs away, with or without a rider.
When a horse eats its feed too rapidly.

bone
A term of art in equine conformation to describe the quality of certain skeletal structures.
"Good" or "poor" bone: technical terminology referencing the size and density of bone of the lower leg, which helps determine the weight carrying ability of a horse.
The characteristics of the lower leg as a whole, including the cannon bone as well as associated tendons and ligaments. "Flat" bone describes a positive feature where the tendons of the leg stand well away from the cannon bone, "tied-in" bone describes the negative characteristic of the tendon placed too close to the bone.

botfly, bot
A parasitic fly that lays its eggs on the legs, muzzle, and jaw of horses.  The eggs are licked off by the horse and once ingested, hatch into maggots, called bots, which infest the animal by attaching to the stomach lining.  The eggs may be scraped off with a bot knife or similar tool.

bowed tendon
 An enlarged tendon along the cannon bones, often resulting from heavy work.

box stall (US)
See loose box

boxwalking (UK)
An example of a horse Stereotypy (non-human) exhibited in horses left in a stable, where they repetitively walk around the confines of the stable. See also Weaving

branding
Marking a horse (or other animal) by burning the skin with a hot iron, or alternatively with a frozen implement (freeze branding).  The skin may be balded, or the hair may grow back in a depigmented color.

breeching
A wide strap around the rear of a horse, to hold a saddle in position or to allow a harnessed horse to pull back on the shafts or pole of a vehicle to slow it.

breeder
The breeder of a foal is the owner of its dam at the time of foaling. The person designated as the breeder may not have had anything to do with planning the mating of the mare or be located where foaling occurs.

breeding
The pedigree of an animal
Horse breeding, or the selective breeding of animals.
A type of horse show competition where horses are led, not ridden.  See in-hand.

breed registry
See stud book

bridle
Headgear placed around the head of a horse that holds the bit in place in a horse's mouth, including reins, used to direct and guide the animal.  Sometimes used to refer to the entire piece of equipment, including headstall, bit and reins. Headstalls that do not have a bit are called either a bitless bridle or a hackamore.

bronc or bronco
Originally an unbroken feral horse, now primarily a word for the horses used in rodeo bronc riding events, where the horse tries to buck off a rider. May describe any undisciplined horse, especially one that bucks.  See also outlaw.

broodmare
A mare that is used for horse breeding.

broodmare sire
See damsire

brothers-in-blood
 Horses either by the same sire and out of full sisters, or out of the same dam and sired by full brothers.

bucking
A behavior where the horse lowers its head and rapidly kicks its hind feet into the air.  At liberty, seen as an expression of excess energy or high spirit, under saddle is generally considered a disobedience, except in sports such as the rodeo sports of  Saddle bronc and bareback riding, where the horse is deliberately encouraged to attempt to dislodge its rider.

bumper pull
 A horse trailer style that is pulled by a hitch attached to the frame of the towing vehicle near the bumper. Contrast with gooseneck below. 

bute
 Common term for Phenylbutazone, a non-steroid anti-inflammatory drug (NSAID) used to control pain and swelling in horses. Some racing commissions and showing authorities restrict its use prior to competition in order to reduce the risk of injury to horses. It is banned in most endurance riding competition.

by
Describes the relationship of a horse to its sire, in the context of its pedigree.  A foal is by its sire and out of its dam.Belknap Horsewords p. 81

C
cannon or cannon bone
The third metacarpal or metatarsal bone of the lower leg.  Sometimes called the shin bone, but actually analogous to the bones in the human palm or foot.  In equines, is a very large bone and provides the major support of the body weight of the horse.  The term cannon may also encompass the soft tissues as well as the second and fourth metacarpal or metatarsal bones, called splint bones which may form ossified bridges of bone, called splints which often form after trauma to the area.

canner (US)
See also dogger
A horse of poor quality, referencing animals destined for slaughter.
Canner price: see meat money.

canter
A three-beat horse gait, with both front and rear legs on one side landing further forward than those on the other side – see lead below. In Western riding, the canter is known as a lope.  The order in which the feet hit the ground varies depending on which legs are leading, but the gait begins with the outside hind, followed by the simultaneous landing of the outside front and inside hind, finished by the inside front. There is a moment during a canter when all four hooves of the horse are off the ground, known as the moment of suspension. A similar gait is the gallop (see below) which is performed at a higher speed, when the second beat is broken into two footfalls, making it a four-beat gait.

carriage
A two-wheeled or four-wheeled vehicle drawn by horses, and used for carrying people.
The way a horse carries itself, especially the way it positions the head and neck.

cart
A two-wheeled vehicle pulled by one or more horses (or other animals).
(Informal, US) A small, light four-wheeled vehicle, usually with bicycle-style tires, used primarily for show ring fine harness competition, and upper levels of pleasure driving.

casting, cast
Casting (UK), throwing (US): forcing a horse (or other large animal) to lie down, allowing safe veterinary or other treatment.  Usually done by an arrangement of ropes or straps.
Cast, the state of an animal laying down that is unable to get up.  May be due to illness or injury.  Also occurs when a horse in a box stall (loose box) rolls over against a wall, trapping its legs against the wall.

castration
The act of neutering, or "gelding" a male horse.

 chef d’équipe
 A person appointed to manage an equestrian team, generally at the state, national or international level.

chestnut
Chestnut (coat):  A reddish-brown coat color with matching or lighter-colored mane and tail.
Chestnut (horse anatomy) :A callosity on the inside of each leg, thought to possibly be a vestigial remnant of the pad of a toe  Not present on the hind legs of donkeys and zebras.  See also ergot.

choke
A condition arising from blockage of the esophagus, most often linked to a horse eating too fast. A horse that is choking can still breathe, but cannot eat or drink.

chrome
 Slang for eye-catching white markings on a horse, usually stockings or socks. Also used to refer to particularly flashy pinto or Appaloosa markings.

cinch
A wide flat girth made of mohair, reinforced felt, or an equivalent synthetic material used in conjunction with a latigo strap to secure a western saddle on the back of a horse.

clipping
Clipping the hair short on all or part of a horse.  Different patterns have different names, such as harness clip, hunter clip etc.

clumper (AU)
A half bred draught horse.  Also see heavy hunter.

cluster mare  (see also star mare)
Dennis Craig's term for a Thoroughbred brood mare whose descendants within six generations include at least two winners of at least five of the top eight English flat races (the five Classics, King George VI and Queen Elizabeth Stakes, Eclipse Stakes, and Ascot Gold Cup).

coach (carriage)
A carriage, usually closed and drawn by two or more horses.

coach house (UK/Ir), carriage house (NAm)
A building used to keep a private carriage and horses, usually with accommodation for a groom, coachman or other servants above.  Essentially a cottage or small house with stabling below.

cob
A stocky, rather small horse, or a large pony.  Often a general description, but also applied to certain breeds such as the Welsh Cob.
A bridle size designed for horses with small or short heads. Usually keeps a long browband and throatlatch to accommodate the wide forehead and jowls of cobs and other horses with somewhat wedge-shaped heads, such as the Arabian or the Morgan.

cold-backed
 A horse that arches its back and may buck slightly when first mounted.

cold-blood
Any of a group of equine types including draught horses and many ponies, characterized by a steady temperament, strength and stamina, but no great turn of speed.  Refers to temperament, not literally to body temperature.  See also hot-blood and warmblood.

colic
Any of a number of painful digestive disorders, usually characterized by intestinal displacement or blockage. A leading cause of death among domesticated horses.

colt
A young male horse that has not been gelded (neutered).  For Thoroughbreds, a colt is under four years of age, in most other breeds and contexts, a colt is under three years of age. Sometimes used incorrectly to refer to any young horse.

combined driving
A driving competition that goes up to the international level.  Individual events are offered for single horses and teams, and competition incorporates three distinct elements:  Dressage, Cross-country Marathon, and Obstacle Cone Driving.

conformation
The shape and proportion of a horse's body.

coronary band, or coronet
The area directly above the horse's hoof: a ring of soft tissue just above the horny hoof that blends into the skin of the leg. Includes the bottom of the middle phalanx bone.

counter canter
A form of the canter where the horse is deliberately asked to canter on a curve with the outside leg leading, which is opposite of usual.  Also known as galop faux, false canter, or counter lead.  It is used to help build muscle and suppleness in a horse. See also lead.

coupling
The sunken area below the lumbar vertebrae or the horse's back, behind the last rib and in front of the point of the hip.  Ideally is to be as short as possible.  The term is sometimes expanded to include where the lumbar region attaches to the sacrum.

covering
Mating in horses: a stallion is said to cover a mare. See also "natural cover" and "artificial insemination".

crib biting (UK) or cribbing (US)
A stable vice where the horse grabs the edge of an object such as a stable door with its incisor teeth and arches its neck.  More severe cases also suck air in simultaneously, and this is termed 'windsucking'.

crop
Crop (implement): A stiff, short-handled whip seen most often in English riding.
All the foals sired in one year. Often used to refer to one particular stallions' foals born in the year, but can also refer to a particular owner, an entire breed, or a region or worldwide crop.

crossbred
A horse that is a cross between two known breeds. Not to be confused with grade, below

croup
The topline and immediate underlying musculature of the hindquarters. Runs from the tail to the loin, and from the point of the hip to the point of the buttock.

crowhop (US)
A mild form of bucking, a stiff-legged hop with a rounded back. Does not involve kicking up the back legs. See also pigroot.

crownpiece (US), headpiece (UK)
The portion of a headstall that goes behind the horse's ears. 

C/S/F or c,s,f (AU)
Abbreviation for catch, shoe and float (transport), used in horse for sale advertisements to describe a horse with good ground manners. Usually expressed as good (or easy) to C/F/S.

curb
Curb bit:  A type of bit that has bit shanks.  It applies leverage pressure to a horse's mouth when the reins are tightened.  The degree of leverage depends on the length of the shank and the positioning of the bit mouthpiece on the shanks.  Is used in conjunction with a curb chain or curb strap so that when the reins are tightened, pressure is also applied to the chin groove and the headstall applies pressure on the poll of the animal. generally characterized by a solid bit mouthpiece of varying designs, but may have a jointed mouthpiece, sometimes mistakenly called a "snaffle". (Compare to snaffle bit, below)
Curb (horse):  Several possible types of lameness for which clinical signs include a swelling on the back of the lower leg.  Any of a collection of soft tissue injuries of the distal plantar hock region.

D
daisy cutter
 A horse that moves with long but low movement. Considered highly desirable in hunter-type horses.

dam
The mother of a horse.

dam line
See distaff, tail-female

damsire
The sire of the dam of a horse, analogous to the maternal grandfather in humans. Often known as the broodmare sire  or maternal grandsire.

diagonal
At a trot, the set of legs that move forward at the same are the "diagonal" pair.
When a rider posts while riding at the trot, they can rise either matching when the left or the right foreleg and opposite hind leg hits the ground. If they sit when the left foreleg strikes, they are on the left diagonal, if they sit when the right foreleg strikes, it is the right diagonal. When riding clockwise, the rider is to post the left diagonal, when riding counter-clockwise the rider is to post the right diagonal. In other words, when riding a circle, the rider sits when the outside front and inside hind legs are on the ground.
3. In dressage tests, a line crossing the center of the competition ring running from one end corner to the opposite end corner.  The diagonal is also used in some driving competition as the route for competitors to safely change direction in a ring or arena when there are a large number of entries.

distaff
 In racing, refers to female horses. Named for the distaff, a spindle used in weaving and traditionally associated with women. In pedigree charts, refers to the entire dam's side of the pedigree.

dock
The muscular portion of a horse's tail, where the hair is rooted.  Sometimes refers only to the upper portion of this area, where the tail attaches to the hindquarters.
Docking:  to cut a horse's tail at the dock, seen most often on carriage horses to keep the tails from becoming caught in the harness. Traditionally referred to the practice of cutting the muscle and bone, though in modern use, sometimes refers only to the cutting of tail hair.

dogger (AU)
 An animal to be used for pet meat, or a buyer of cattle or horses to be used for this purpose.
see also Canner

Domestic Horse
Equus ferus caballus, the subspecies of the Wild Horse (Equus ferus) that has gone through the process of domestication.

dope, doping
 To use a medication that is illegal or used in an illegal manner in order to improve a horse's performance in either racing or showing, or, by an opponent, to harm an animal and cause it to perform poorly.

double-bank
To carry an extra person on a horse or pony.

draft horse (US) or draught horse (UK)
Generic term encompassing many breeds of large, muscular, heavy horses developed primarily as farm or harness horses, used for plowing fields, pulling wagons, logging and similar heavy pulling work.

dressage
A classical form of horse training, involving the gradual training of the horse in stages.
An Olympic level equine sport based on classical principles of horsemanship, involving taking tests designed to gauge the training level of horses in classical dressage. Lower levels of dressage competition are organized by national equestrian organizations, but the higher levels, including the Olympics, are governed by the Federation Equestre Internationale.

drift
A New Forest term for the gathering of semi-feral ponies for marking, veterinary treatment or sale. See also muster, and roundup.

driving
Guiding and controlling one or more horses from behind, such as from a horse-drawn vehicle, behind a plow or other implement, when pulling logs, boats or other loads, or when long-reining (q.v.).  Guidance is by long reins and voice, often using traditional commands characteristic of particular areas or cultures.

E
easy keeper (US) or good doer (UK)
A horse (or other animal) which needs relatively little food to maintain condition and may be prone to obesity.

English riding (US), riding (UK)
The style of riding ubiquitous in the British Isles and other parts of northern Europe, and widely practised in other parts of the world, especially for disciplines such as dressage, show-jumping, cross-country etc.  Characterised by use of a relatively flat saddle; the bridle usually has a cavesson-style noseband, with reins carried in both hands and generally used with steady contact with the horse's mouth.

equestrian
An individual familiar with horses and horse handling. It can also refer to someone riding a horse. The feminine form is Equestrienne.
referring to the management and use of horses.
The Equestrian order, an upper-class social rank of Ancient Rome, akin to the later knight.

equestrianism
Also called horsemanship, the art of handling horses, particularly the art of riding, but also applicable to driving and other disciplines.

equine
Any member of the genus Equus.

equitation
The skill of riding a horse.
A term for competitive horse show events judged on the rider's ability instead of that of the horse.

Equus
The genus including the horse, donkey, zebra and all other surviving members of the family Equidae.

ergot
A small callosity on the back of the fetlocks of equines, often concealed by feathering (hair). Thought to be a vestigial remnant of the pad of the toe.  See also chestnut.
A fungus of the genus Claviceps growing parasitically on the seed-heads of grasses, and so sometimes occurring in fodder eaten by horses.  Contains large amounts of alkaloids, including ergotamine.  These can cause ergotism, a serious condition affecting the nervous and circulatory systems, sometimes leading to permanent injury or death.

eventing or combined training
A sport horse discipline with competition that goes as high as the Olympic level.  Includes three types of riding; dressage, cross-country and stadium jumping.

F
false martingale
A strap in horse harness passing from the collar, through the horse's legs to the belly band, to hold the collar in position.  Unlike a true martingale does not attach to the reins or head.  See also martingale.

family
The direct line of female descent, also known as the distaff line or tail female. Thoroughbred families are numbered according to their taproot mares.  See tail-female.

farrier
A professional hoof care specialist who does hoof trimming and who also uses blacksmithing skills to do horse shoeing.
Someone who treats all aspects of horse health.

feathering or feather
Long hair on the fetlocks of horses.  Most horses have some feather, at least in their winter coats, but in some types (especially certain heavy draft breeds) it may cover the feet and even extend up the rear of the legs. The feather is centered on the ergot (q.v.) on the rear of the fetlock.

Fédération Équestre Internationale,  International Federation for Equestrian Sports, or FEI
The governing body for most international-level equestrian competitions, including the FEI World Equestrian Games and the Olympics.  It recognizes and governs ten disciplines: dressage, combined driving, endurance riding, eventing, horseball, para-equestrian, reining, show jumping, tent pegging, and equestrian vaulting.  The FEI does not govern horse racing or polo.

feedbag, nosebag
A bag, containing food, that attaches to a horse's head.

feral horse
Free-roaming horses that live in wild conditions, but are descended from domesticated ancestors – often erroneously called "wild" horses.  The best-known examples are the American Mustang and the Australian Brumby, but there are many other populations worldwide.  See also semi-feral horse (to which the term "feral" is often misapplied).

fetlock
The joint above the pastern. Anatomically, the metacarpophalangeal (front) and metatarsophalangeal (rear) joints of the horse, formed by the junction of the third metacarpal (forelimb) or metatarsal (hindlimb) bones (also known as the cannon bones) and the proximal phalanx distad (the pastern bone).  Anatomically equivalent to the basal joint of a human finger or toe.

filly
A young female horse. Normally a horse under four years of age, but can also be used of a horse under three years of age. Any female horse that has had a foal is referred to as a mare, regardless of her age.

flank
The side of a horse

float
To rasp down sharp points that may form on horse teeth.  Usually performed by a veterinarian or Equine dentistry specialist.
(Australasia)  A horse trailer.

flying change
See lead change.

foal
A young horse of either sex under the age of one year. Derives from the Anglo-Saxon word fola.  May be qualified by sex: colt foal, filly foal.
Foaling: the act of a mare giving birth.

foaling box (UK), foaling stall (US)
A large loose box providing space and privacy for a mare about to foal. Minimum size is usually  square. Often provided with a small window or peep-hole (or in modern times a closed-circuit camera or webcam) for the owner or groom to watch the progress of the foaling.

foal at foot (UK), foal at side (US)
A suckling foal running with its dam.

form
In racing, the overall fitness of a horse to race. It includes factors such as how well it is currently working, what its breeding is, and how it has performed in the past.
In jumping, the style that a horse uses going over fences.
In equine conformation, the overall phenotype of the animal and its suitability for a given function.

founder
The most severe form of laminitis, an inflammatory condition affecting the laminae of the hoof. The third phalanx, or coffin bone rotates, often becoming deformed, and in severe cases, may puncture the bottom surface of the hoof.  Severe cases may require euthanasia of the affected animal.  A leading cause of death among domesticated horses, especially in breeds which are easy keepers (good doers).

foundation sire
A sire, or stallion, to which all members of a breed trace. Examples include the Byerly Turk, Godolphin Arabian, and Darley Arabian for the Thoroughbred breed; and Justin Morgan, aka Figure for the Morgan breed.

four-in-hand
A team of four horses with all their reins joined into one pair of reins, allowing one driver to control all of them.  Also six-in-hand etc.

frog
A tough, rubbery, triangular part of the underside of a horse hoof that acts as a shock absorber for the horse's foot and also assists in blood circulation of the lower leg.

from
See out of.

full board (US), full livery (UK)
 When a horse is kept at a stable other than that owned by the horse's owner, when the owner pays for complete care of the horse. Usually includes all feed, the rent of the stall and pasture, and cleaning of the stall. Often includes access to a riding arena and in some places may even include daily turnout or exercise. Contrast with part-board, below.

full-brother, full-sister
Animals with the same sire and the same dam.Belknap Horsewords p. 442

furlong
A unit of measurement in flat horse racing.

futurity
A stakes race for two-year-olds where the owners nominate the horse before birth and then pay additional fees as the horse grows up to continue the ability to enter the horse in the race.Belknap Horsewords p. 204
A horse show competition for horses of a specified age, where the owners nominate the horse either before birth or as a young foal and then pay additional fees as the horse grows up to continue the eligibility to enter the horse in the class at the proper time. Futurities exist for many different horse breeds and equestrian disciplines.

Five gaited
1. A horse with five gaits. ( walk, trot, canter, rack, slow gait) in saddle seat

G
gallop
 The fastest natural horse gait.  Like the canter, there is a moment during a gallop when all four hooves of the horse are off the ground, known as the moment of suspension. At racing speeds, the gallop differs from the canter in that it becomes an irregular four beat gait, rather than a three-beat gait: the second beat of the canter, where diagonal front and hind legs strike the ground simultaneously, is broken into two beats in very quick succession in the gallop. Used in the wild to escape predators, the gallop is the gait of the classic race horse.

Galloway
Horse type:  Australian show horses standing over 14 hands and not exceeding 15 hands.
The Galloway pony, a now-extinct horse breed.

gait
The way a horse moves its legs is a gait. They are divided into natural gaits, which are those performed by most horses, and those that are either trained by humans or that are specific to a few breeds. The natural gaits are walk, trot, canter/lope, and gallop. Other gaits include the pace and ambling gaits such as the rack and single-foot.Belknap Horsewords p. 205

gaited horse
A horse that performs intermediate-speed ambling gaits other than the trot, or in addition to the trot. Several horse breeds are considered gaited, including the Peruvian Paso, Paso Fino, Saddlebred, Missouri Fox Trotter, and Tennessee Walking Horse.

gelding
A castrated male horse of any age.

get
The offspring of a stallion. See also produce.

girth
Wide, flat strap made of leather, canvas, cord, or similar synthetic materials, used in conjunction with billets at each end to secure most types of English and Australian saddles to a horse's back. See also cinch.

glass eye, wall eye
A blue eye on a horse.  There is no difference in vision between a blue-eyed horse and a horse with the more common brown eye.

good doer
See easy keeper.

gooseneck

A type of horse trailer that attaches to a gooseneck hitch, a ball placed in the bed of a pickup truck above the axle, rather than a hitch at the rear of the vehicle. The hitch connects to the underside of a long extension, or "gooseneck", that extends from the front of the trailer. Compare to "bumper pull", above. 

grade
A horse that has only a small amount of recognizable breeding, or none at all.  Generally an unregistered and unregisterable animal.  Not to be confused with crossbred, above.

Grand Prix
In equestrianism, the highest levels of either show jumping or dressage, generally governed by the rules of the FEI.  The title is also given to some horse races.

green
 A horse or rider that is either untrained or has just started training.

green-broke
 A horse that has just begun its training and is inexperienced with riders. Usually references horses that have been ridden under saddle a few times, less often applied to harness horses.

groom
An employee who looks after horses.  Also ostler or hostler (archaic).

grooming
Cleaning horses for hygienic, practical or esthetic reasons.

groundwork
To exercise or work a horse without a rider, controlling it from the ground.
In jumping, training a horse without jumping over fences.

H
hack
A mediocre but useful horse.
An informal ride, usually for leisure or exercise (alsohacking or hacking out).
Show hack, a type of horse show competition, usually emphasizing obedience and excellent movement.

hackamore
A type of headgear that utilizes a noseband or a bosal for control instead of a bit.

half-breed
A type of crossbred horse whose sire and dam are from different breeds.
(UK) A horse whose sire or dam is Thoroughbred, but the other parent is not. Such a horse is not eligible for registration in the General Stud Book, but can be registered in the Half-Bred stud book.

half-brother, half-sister
Two horses with the same dam.  Two horses with the same sire are simply said to be by the same sire.

halter
1a.(US) A device placed on the head of an equine for the primary purpose of leading or tying the animal; See also head collar.
1b.(Australasia and UK) A rope headpiece with the lead rope attached; or a rolled leather headpiece of the same pattern used for leading and showing horses with refined heads.Summerhayes Encyclopaedia for Horsemen p. 150
2. A halter class in a horse show is a competition where the horses are led, not ridden, and judged on their conformation. Also called in-hand or breeding classes.

hand
A measurement of the height of a horse. Originally taken from the size of a grown man's hand but now standardized to 4 inches. The measurement is usually taken from the ground to the withers. If expressed with a period and number after it, the number represents additional inches, so 15.3 hands ("fifteen-three") would be 15 times four inches, plus three inches – that is, .  Abbreviated "hh" for "hands high" or simply "h".

hand gallop
A controlled gallop, with a speed between that of a canter and a full gallop. Derives from the fact that the gallop is under control of the rider's hand. Often used to show a horse's ground-covering stride in horse show competition.

hard keeper (US), poor doer (UK)
A horse (or other animal) which needs a relatively large amount of food to maintain condition.

haute école, high school
The most advanced form of dressage, wherein the horse performs the most difficult movements such as pirouette, passage, piaffe and one-tempi lead changes.  In classical dressage, includes the airs above the ground as the final step in training.

harness
A type of horse tack placed upon a horse or other animal in order to hitch it to a cart, plow (UK:  plough), wagon or other horse-drawn vehicle.

harness racing, trotting races
The sport of racing horses in harness, pulling a very light single-person cart called a sulky.  The horses usually trot or pace.

hayloft, hay loft
A floored space above a barn or stable where hay is stored, often being fed through hatches in the floor directly into hay-racks in the animal  enclosures below.  The hayloft door is a high-level hatch (usually in a gable wall), through which hay could be loaded directly from a wagon.

head-collar (Australasia and UK)
A device placed on the head of an equine for the primary purpose of leading or tying the animal;Price, et al. Lyons Press Horseman's Dictionary p. 102 See also halter and headstall.

head-shy, headshy
A horse which is reluctant to have its head touched or handled, making it difficult to groom and tack up.

headstall, head stall
The portion of a bridle that consists of the straps that go over the horse's head and under the throat, excluding the noseband, used to hold the bit in place.
An alternate name for a head collar (UK).

heavy
A rider who uses too much rein pressure is said to have "heavy" hands.
In racing, a track that is between muddy and good, in other words one that is drying out.
A draft horse is sometimes called a "heavy" horse.

heavy hunter
A heavily built hunter, typically bred by crossing a Thoroughbred with an Irish Draught (in UK) or any other suitable draft horse breed (in US).  Also see clumper.

Hendra virus or henipavirus
 A deadly disease to which both humans and horses are susceptible.

hinny, hinney
A sterile hybrid that is the offspring of a male horse and a female donkey.  Generally considered less desirable than a mule, though has a similar appearance and characteristics. Bred less often than mules because the offspring are smaller than mules and female donkeys are less fertile with stallions than mares are with male donkeys. Also occasionally known as bardot or jennet.

hitch
The object attached to a vehicle to allow a trailer to be attached and pulled.
To fasten a harnessed horse to a carriage or other horse-drawn vehicle. (BI: Put to).
To tie or tether a horse to a stationary object such as a post to keep it from wandering.

hitch and hop
A carriage driving term when one horse of a pair momentarily breaks its trotting stride to realign its gait to trot in synchronisation with the other horse creating a harmonised pair, in a ‘hitch and hop’ movement.

hobble
A strap or other device placed around the pastern of the leg to prevent a horse (or other livestock animal) from wandering far, usually by linking two or more legs together.  A "half-hobble" attaches to only one foot, with the other end usually attached to a rope called a picket line.

hock
The tarsal joint of the equine hind leg, located midway between the horse's body and the ground.  Anatomically corresponds to the ankle and heel of the human, but in horses is located much farther from the ground.

horse
Wild Horse: Equus ferus.
a. Tarpan or Eurasian Wild Horse: Equus ferus ferus.
b. Domestic Horse: Equus ferus caballus.
c. Przewalski's Horse: Equus ferus przewalskii.
In some circumstances, may refer to members of that species that are taller than 14.2 hands high.
A  male horse, particularly an uncastrated male horse.

horse blanket, blanket  (US), rug (UK), sheet
A body covering made for horses that covers the animal's body from chest to rump, usually kept on the horse by buckles at the chest by buckles and by adjustable straps passing under the belly and sometimes around the hind legs.  Heavier weight blankets assist in keeping the animal warm in cold weather, lighter weight designs are used in warm weather to deter insects and to keep the sun from bleaching out the horse's coat. Blankets may also have hoods or neck coverings added for additional protection of the animal.Compare to Saddle blanket, Numnah.

horse-drawn boat

 horsecar, 
A tram pulled by a horse

horse meat
The meat of equines, eaten in many cultures, but taboo in others.

horse passport
A document required in European Union countries for every equine animal, including a detailed description of the animal and a record of whether it is intended for human consumption.  May be linked to a microchip implant.

horse power (hp)
A unit of power, originally used to compare the power of mechanical devices to that of a draft horse.  Roughly equivalent to the normal sustained power output of one horse – however the maximum power of a horse is much more than one horsepower.  A metric horsepower equals approximately 735.5 watts, and an imperial horsepower (or imperial horsepower) equals approximately 745.7 watts.

horse racing
The sport of racing horses, a major industry in many parts of the world.  Racehorses are usually Thoroughbreds (or Arabs) ridden at the gallop, but other breeds are also raced, and horses or ponies may also be raced at the trot or pace, when they are usually in harness (see harness racing).

horseshoe
A curved bar attached to the underside of the wall of the hoof, to prevent wear and provide grip.  Usually made of steel and nailed to the hoof, but may be of aluminum or other materials, and may be glued on.  Usually used on all four hooves, but sometimes only on the front, or not used at all (see barefoot).

horsiculture (UK)
An informal term in UK land use planning, referring to land used intensively for keeping recreational horses, often with many small paddocks and numerous field shelters.

horse trailer (US), horse van, horse box (UK), horse float (Australasia)
A trailer or van designed to carry horses.

hostler (NAm), ostler (UK/Ir)
Archaic term for a horse groom. (See groom, above)

hot-blood, hot-blooded
Horses descended from oriental horse or "eastern" blood, such as the Arabian horse, Barb, Turkoman horse, and related breeds.  Usually includes the Thoroughbred.

hunt seat (US)
Classic form of English riding, particularly seen in hacking, trail riding, jumping.

hunter
Show hunter (US), hunter (US) or working hunter (US and UK):  A type of horse  and horse show competition judged on its movement, manners, and way of going, particularly over fences. A hunter should be graceful and keep a long frame on the flat and while jumping fences.
Field hunter (US), hunter (US, UKI):  a horse used for fox hunting.  Subdivided by weight: heavy hunter, light hunter etc.
Show hunter (British):  a competition for horses that are shown on the flat, not to jump.

I

J

K

L
laminitis
Inflammation of the sensitive laminae of the hoof.  Possibly linked to metabolic disturbances, often associated with obesity or ingestion of excess starches or sugars.  Causes lameness and severe pain.  Treatable if caught early, but in its most severe form, known as "founder", may require euthanasia of the affected animal.

latigo
Soft, flexible strap made of leather, attached to a heavy ring on a saddle tree, used to attach a cinch to a western saddle. Modern latigo usually has holes punched for a cinch buckle. On older saddles the latigo had no holes and the cinch was secured to the saddle with the latigo tied in a latigo hitch or girth hitch, a variation of the cow hitch. See also billets.

lead
Lead (leg): the leading legs of the horse at the canter and gallop. The front and hind legs on one side of the horse appear to land in front of the other set of front and hind legs when the horse travels.  On a curve, a horse is generally asked to lead with the inside legs, though there are exceptions to the general rule, such as the counter canter.  See also lead change.
Lead (tack):  a lead rope, lead shank or leading rein. A flat line or rope attached to a halter and used to lead the animal when the handler is on the ground.

lead change, change of leg
The act of a horse changing from one lead to the other.  When performed at a canter or gallop, it is a "flying change".  When the horse is dropped to a slower gait and then asked to canter again but on the opposite lead, it is a "simple change".  Performing a flying change with every stride is an advanced dressage movement known as a one-tempi change, tempi changes, or informally, "onesies".

leader
Any of the horses in a team which are ahead of the shafts or pole.  Can only pull the vehicle, not slow it.  See also wheeler.

live foal guarantee
 A guarantee that a bred mare will have a living foal from a breeding to a stallion. Usually offered by the stallion's owner and allows the mare to be rebred if for some reason the resulting foal is stillborn or is not living.

Liverpool bit
A type of adjustable curb bit used for horses in harness, allowing the horses in a team to be driven with the same rein tension.

livery stable, livery yard
An establishment providing livery (UK) or boarding (US) for horse-owners – care, stabling or pasture, depending on type.

loose-box (UK), box stall (US)
An enclosed area within a stable where a horse may be left untethered (loose). Minimum size is usually  square up to about  square. Contrast with tie stall, a smaller enclosure where the animal is kept tied or tethered. See also stall.

longeing  (US), lungeing (UK, Australasia, US)

long-reining, long-lining,  line driving
Driving a horse while walking behind or to the side of it, controlling the animal by use of very long reins.  Used for training, both for riding and driving.  For a riding horse, the stirrups are often used as makeshift terrets to keep the reins from trailing on the ground.

lope (US)
A form of the canter seen in western-style riding; a three beat gait, performed at a relatively slow speed.

loriner (UK)
A maker of metal parts for harnesses, bridles, spurs, and other horse apparel.

M

N

O

P

pace
A two-beat, lateral gait where the front and hind legs on the same side move forward at the same time.  Difficult to ride, but the fastest of the intermediate gaits, particularly seen in harness racing and the "flying pace" of the Icelandic horse.
In horse racing, may refer to the speed of the leaders of a given race, i.e. "setting the pace" or "off the pace".
The speed of a horse or, as a verb, to regulate the speed of a horse, particularly over distance.
A group of asses, also known as a passe.

paddock
A fenced enclosure where horses are kept.
In racing, the location where the racehorses are mounted before a race and unsaddled after a race.

pair
Two draft animals side-by-side.  Often the same animals will always be worked the same way around.  See team and tandem.

parrot mouth
A congenital malformation of the upper jaw where the incisor teeth protrude beyond the lower jaw. Sometimes known as overshot.

pastern
The segment of the leg between the fetlock and the coronary band.  Anatomically, two short bones, the proximal phalanx and the middle phalanx.

pedigree
The known and documented lineage of an animal.
The written pedigree chart outlining the lineage of an animal.

performance class
 A category of horse show classes where horses are exhibited in harness or under saddle and judging is based on how they perform the tasks asked of them.  May also refer to equitation classes, where the skill of the rider is judged.  Contrast to a halter class which is judged solely on the horse's conformation. Compare Halter, "in hand" 

phenotype
The outward appearance of an animal, in contrast to genotype, the genetic inheritance of an animal.

pigroot or pigjump (UK and Australasia)
A milder form of bucking See also crowhop.

pinhooking
  The practise of buying young horses with the specific intention of reselling them for a profit. In the UK, typically refers to  buying Thoroughbred weanlings and yearlings.

place
In horse racing, a placed horse is one that finishes second in a race (NAm), or in the first three places (AU/NZ/UK),Delbridge The Macquarie Dictionary, 2nd ed., p. 1352 A place bet is a bet that a horse will place.[193] In the (UK/Ir) place bets may be pay up to fourth place if there are 16 or more runners in a race. Example of UK/Ir place-bet definition.
In horse shows, any award ranking, particularly one other than first "place", usually second through fifth or sixth place.

plug
A common horse of no particular value.

point coloration, points
The tail, edges of the ears, mane, and lower legs of a horse. Used in determining the color of a horse.

points of a horse
Collective term in horse anatomy for the external parts of a horse, such as crest, withers, shoulder, cannon, etc.

pointing
Resting a foreleg; indicating soreness in that leg or foot.

pole
A single rigid bar extending from the front of a vehicle, being held between a pair of horses (or other draft animals).  Allows the animals to steer and slow the vehicle.  See also shafts.
Poling, the practice (usually illegal on horse show grounds) of deliberately hitting the legs of a show jumper while it is in the air over a fence, said to make it fold up its legs and jump higher.

pony
Individual animals of breeds that typically mature over this height may still be called "horses" even if under the cutoff height. In some parts of the world, the cutoff is at 14 hands instead of 14.2.
Biologically, may be used to define small horses that retain a pony phenotype of relatively short height  heavy coat, thick mane and tail, proportionally short legs, and heavy build regardless of actual mature height.
For competition purposes, depending on organizational rules and local tradition, may also be used for an adult horse of any breed of 14.2, 14.1, or 14 hands or less at the time of competition.
Leading one horse while riding another.
A horse used in the sport of polo.

poor doer
See hard keeper.

posting, rising to the trot
 To rise up out of the saddle and then gently sit back down in rhythm with the horse's motion while it is trotting. Posting the trot is generally more comfortable for both rider and horse. See also Diagonal.

Prix St. Georges
The first of the international competitive dressage levels in FEI competition.  It is followed by  Intermediare I, Intermediare II and Grand Prix.  Levels below Prix St. Georges, though common in local and national-level competition, are not recognized by the FEI. The terms used for these lower levels and number of levels available vary from nation to nation.

produce
The offspring of a mare.  See also get.

pulling
Trimming the mane or tail by pulling out the longer hairs.

purebred
An animal with documented parentage recognized by a breed registry as being descended in all lines from recognized foundation bloodstock and free of admixture of breeding from lines outside those of the breed in question.  Not to be confused with Thoroughbred, which is a specific breed of horse with very strict standards for purebred status.

purse
 Prize money in a competition, horse show class, or race.

putting to (BI), hitching (NA)
Attaching a harnessed horse to a vehicle.

Q

R

rearing
When a horse rises up on its hind legs. If performed while being handled by humans, is usually considered a severe, dangerous disobedience.  Occasionally, horses are trained to rear on command for uses such as film or circus work. Rearing may occur while an animal is loose, being ridden, or while being handled by a human from the ground.

registration papers, registration certificate, papers, pedigree papers
Documentation provided by a breed registry that verifies the breeding and ownership of an animal. Usually includes a pedigree chart and an outline illustration indicating horse markings.  Some organizations may include a photograph of the animal.

ridgling, rig
A male horse with one or more undescended testicles (a cryptorchid), or one which is incompletely castrated (deliberately or accidentally). If both testicles are not descended, the horse may appear to be a gelding, but will still behave like a stallion. See also stallion, gelding.

ring sour (US)
A horse that exhibits competition burnout through undesired behavioral problems, including a disinterest in work, reluctance to move forward, pinned back ears, a twisting or wringing tail, or overall disobedience in the ring.

rising
See posting.

rein
Item of horse tack, attached as a pair to either side of a bit in the horse's mouth, used to direct or guide a horse for riding or driving.

roller
See surcingle.

roundup
The gathering of horses or other livestock in the American West.  See also muster, drift.

rug (UK, Australasia)
see horse blanket

S
saddle
A device placed on the back of a horse or other equine, where the rider sits, designed to support and stabilize a rider. Comes in two main varieties, a stock saddle (western or Australian designs), and flatter types, known as English in the United States, which are used for jumping, dressage and racing.
A part of a horse harness placed on the back, forming an attachment point for several other harness parts, taking the weight of the shafts or pole.

saddle blanket
Often a wool or synthetic blanket, but informally may also refer to felt, fleece, or other padding that is placed between the horse and a saddle to protect the horse's back.  Some types of English saddles are designed so that they do not mandate use of a blanket to protect the horse, but use of one helps keep the underside of the saddle clean and may prevent saddle sores on the horse.

saddle pad (US)
Padding placed under the saddle, shaped fully or partially to complement the outline of the saddle.  See numnah 
Rectangular padding, usually at least an inch thick, placed under a western saddle to provide more protection and support than a saddle blanket.

saddle seat
A form of English riding popularized in the United States for riding gaited horses and other breeds where high, flashy, action is encouraged, notably the American Saddlebred, Morgan horse, and Arabian horse.
The style of saddle used for this discipline, also known as a park saddle, lane fox, or cutback.  Is designed to set the rider farther back on the horse, not intended for jumping.

sand roll
A stall or yard covered with deep sand, which is used by horses to roll in after exercise.

semi-feral horse
Domesticated horses or ponies allowed to roam freely, but owned by individuals and rounded up from time to time.  Examples include New Forest, Dartmoor and Exmoor ponies in their native locations, stock horses on many ranches in the American west, and some modern Iberian horses in Spain and Portugal.  Herds often consist only of mares (with or without suckling foals), but stallions may be turned out in the mating season, with weanlings (especially colts) removed for sale in the autumn.  The term may also refer to "bachelor herds" of young colts or geldings that are not old enough to be placed under saddle, or retired geldings too old to ride.  See feral horse.

shafts
A pair of rigid bars extending from the front of a horse-draw vehicle, attached to the sides of the horse (or other draft animal).  Allows the animal to steer the vehicle, to slow it, and in the case of a two-wheeled vehicle, to hold it level.  Used for a single animal, for the rearmost of several animals in tandem, or sometimes to act as poles between three horses abreast (a troika).  See pole.

show
In US horse racing, the horse that comes in third in a given race.  Also a bet that a horse will finish third or better.
A horse show, a competitive event or series of events where horses are judged in a wide variety of ways depending on breed, discipline and part of the world.

show jumping
Also stadium jumping'''; a competition that goes as high as the Olympic level, where the horse is judged on the number of obstacles it clears on the course in a given round and the speed at which it completes the course. When a course is not timed, or in the event of a tie,  the height of obstacles is raised in each successive round, most notably in puissance competition, until there is a winner.Whitaker, et al. The Horse pp. 160–171

shuttle stallion
A stallion who is regularly transported between the Northern and Southern hemispheres in order to cover mares during both breeding seasons.

shying
When a horse jumps in fright, usually at a sudden movement or an unfamiliar object.
side saddle, sidesaddle
A form of riding where a (normally female) rider sits with both legs to the near side of the horse, rather than with legs astride.
A saddle designed for the above style of riding

silhouette, outline diagram
A standard set of diagrams of an individual horse showing its identifying features, including markings and the locations of all its hair whorls.  May form part of a horse passport, or of registration/pedigree papers, or both.

sire
The father of a horse.

smooth mouth
Older horses who have worn the indentations or "cups" from their incisors, which usually occurs by about the age of eight.

snaffle bit
A type of bit that applies direct pressure to the horse's mouth, i.e. a bit without leverage. Generally considered the mildest type of pressure, though severity can vary depending on the type of bit mouthpiece used.  The most common style of snaffle bit has a jointed mouthpiece, but the term refers to a direct pressure bit with any type of mouthpiece, solid or jointed. Term sometimes is incorrectly used to refer to a curb bit with a jointed mouthpiece. (Compare to curb bit)

snort
 A loud harsh sound emitted when a horse holds its head high and forces the breath violently through the nostrils with the mouth shut. The snort lasts about one second and is most commonly heard in horses when they are startled.

sound
Technical terminology used to describe a healthy horse.

sour
 A horse that is grumpy and unhappy when being ridden. Usually happens through too much work.

splints
Ossification of the second and fourth metacarpal or metatarsal bones, which often form after trauma to the area.  Often an unsoundness when newly injured, may ossify into blemishes with no effect on soundness, depending on location.
Splint bones, the second and fourth metacarpal or metatarsal bones, thought to be vestiges of the toes possessed by prehistoric equines.

sport horse
General term for a type of horse bred or trained for use in the international and Olympic equestrian disciplines of eventing, dressage, jumping.  In some cases may also include hunters and horses used in combined driving.

stable
A building in which horses are kept (also sometimes other livestock).  In UK usage, also the space for one horse within a larger building.
A group of horses owned by one individual or group.

stable hand (US), stable lad/lass (UK)
A groom employed to look after horses, especially for horse racing.  "Lad" and "lass" in this context do not imply youth.

stable vices
Any of a number of  repetitive or nervous behaviors seen most often in horses kept in confinement.  Usually attributed to boredom and insufficient exercise, though temperament may also play a role. Stable vices include cribbing, weaving, wood chewing, wall-kicking and similar behaviors.

stagecoach
A large coach pulled by horses used in former times as public transport.  A team of four or more horses would be used, being changed at regular intervals–"stages"–for a fresh team.

stall (US), stable (UK)
An enclosure within a stable building in which an individual horse is kept. Two types, box stall (US) or loose box (UK) and tie stall (US) or stall (UK).

stallion
A mature, uncastrated male horse, usually four years old and older, although sometimes refers to a horse three years of age or older. Other terms include entire, stud, stud horse, full, full horse, stone horse, stock horse, or bull.

star mare 
As cluster mare, except that descendants will have won three or four of the top eight races, rather than five or more.

stirrup
Paired small light frames or rings for receiving the foot of a rider, attached to the saddle by a strap, called a stirrup leather.  Used to aid in mounting and as a support while riding.Price, et al. Lyons Press Horseman's Dictionary p. 203  In UK usage and for English riding in some US regions, the term "stirrup" includes both the metal frame, or iron, and the stirrup leather, the strap used to suspend the iron from the saddle.  In western riding, the term "stirrup" refers only to the frame, which on a western saddle is often made of wood covered with leather. See also iron.

stock horse
A horse used to herd and manage livestock on a ranch or station.
Generic term encompassing the horse breeds found in the American west that were developed for handling cattle.
The Australian Stock Horse, a specific horse breed.
Any horse used for various competitions that are based and judged on cattle handling or agility skills such as reining, cutting, campdrafting or similar events.

stock saddle
Several designs of a heavier style of saddle with a deep, secure seat, usually with flared pommels and a high cantle. Designed to help keep the rider seated when a horse makes rapid turns or stops, such as when working livestock.
An Australian stock saddle seen more often in the Southern Hemisphere.
A western saddle, seen more often in the United States.

stride
The distance from the imprint of a forefoot until the same foot hits the ground again.

string
The race horses being trained by an individual horse trainer.  Sometimes used to refer to any group of horses trained or used by a single entity for a particular purpose, such as a string of polo ponies, a "show string" of horse show entries, or a pack string.

stringhalt
A nervous disorder in horses, causing a jerking movement, a higher-than-natural gait, of one or both hind legs, as if stepping over an invisible object.

stud
An establishment where pedigreed horses are bred.At stud, a stallion being kept for breeding.
(US)  Informal and technically incorrect term for a stallion.

stud book
(Also breed registry) a list of horses of a particular breed whose parents are known.  An open stud book allows parents of different breeds, as long as the horse conforms to the breed standard or meets other criteria, and is often used when establishing new breeds. A closed stud book requires both parents to be in the book, with lineage traceable to the foundation bloodstock. The thoroughbred breed is an example of a closed stud book.  Many warmblood breeds such as the Oldenburger have an open stud book with animals approved for registry via a studbook selection process.
A  list of stallions of a particular breed "standing at stud", that is, actively being bred.
(UK) Another term for the General Stud Book, the stud book for Thoroughbreds in the United Kingdom and Ireland.

substance
Assessment of the overall muscularity of a horse, width and depth of body and quality of bone.

suckling, suckling foal
A young foal that is nursing, not yet weaned from its mother.

sulky
A lightweight, two-wheeled cart for one person pulled by a single horse (or sometimes a pair).  In earlier times used as a fast, showy form of transport, but now usually limited to harness racing, when it is often made extremely lightly, with bicycle-style wheels.

surcingle
Surcingle (NAm, UK/Ir), roller (UK/Ir, Au/NZ).  A piece of training equipment which goes around the barrel of the horse. Usually padded at the top, and buckles around the horse.  Often has rings placed at various locations for attachment of reins, a crupper and/or an overcheck.  Specialized designs also used in equestrian vaulting.
A long unpadded strap that passes around the barrel of a horse.  One design is placed over a saddle and is fastened with a buckle, used on racing, polo and Australian stock saddles. Other designs are used to hold on certain styles of horse blankets.

T
tack
 All the equipment that horses wear, such as saddles, bridles, harnesses, halters, and other horse care equipment.

tack room
A store where tack is kept.

tail-Female, mare line, dam line, bottom line
The single line of mares, from the dam to maternal granddam, maternal great-granddam and so on. Usually shown on the bottom side of a pedigree chart. Corresponds in biology to mtDNA.

tandem
A draft animal arrangement with two or more animals in single file, the rearmost (the wheeler) in shafts.

team
Several animals pulling a vehicle.  Arranged in various configurations, most commonly as a pair (two side by side), in tandem (two or more in single file), a four (two pairs) or a six.  More rarely other arrangements such as three or more abreast, a troika (three abreast with shafts between), a "pickax" (three abreast with a pair of wheelers behind) or a "unicorn" (a single animal in front of a pair of wheelers).

Thoroughbred
 When used as a proper noun, refers to a specific breed of horse, best known as a race horse. Occasionally used as a non-proper noun to mean purebred.

three-quarter brother/sister
Horses out of the same dam, by stallions that are (maternal) half brothers, or a father and son.

three-quarter brother-in-blood/sister-in-blood
Horses by the same sire, and out of half-sisters, or out of a mother and daughter.

three-quarter genetic brother/sister  Horses who share one sire, and the same maternal grandsire (damsire). Put simply, horses that share three grandparents.

tie stall (US), stall (UK)

topline
The area on a horse that runs from the poll to the dock.
On a pedigree chart, the paternal side of the ancestry, which is given on the top of the chart.

transition
The change from one gait to another.

tree
The underlying solid structure or frame of a saddle, which is covered with leather.

trap, pony trap
A light two-wheeled vehicle.

trot
A diagonal, two-beat, intermediate-speed horse gait.

trotting races
See harness racingtwitch
A tool used to restrain and calm a horse by twisting a cord or chain around its upper lip.

typey
 Slang for a horse that conforms to its breed standards, or type.

U

V

W

wagon, waggon (UK)
A four-wheeled vehicle pulled by one or more horses or other draft animals.  Usually used for carrying loads.

walk
A four-beat gait, the slowest of the natural horse gaits.

warmblood
A descriptive word for many middle-weight sport horse types and breeds, most originally developed in Europe by the crossbreeding of draft or heavy harness horses on light horse breeds such as Thoroughbreds or Arabians. "Warm" refers to its origin as a cross of a cold-blood, and a hot-blood – it does not relate to body temperature.

weanling
A foal that has been weaned from its mother, but is less than one year old.

weaving (US)
A habit, considered a stable vice, developed by some horses kept for long periods in a stable, in which the horse repetitively sways side to side, shifting weight and moving its head and neck back and forth. See also Boxwalking.

western riding
A style of riding characterized by use of a western saddle and a bridle without a noseband.  Riders generally have a fairly long stirrup, sit rather than post the trot (hence a slower trot, called a "jog" is generally desired in the western horse) and, on a finished western horse, reins are usually carried one-handed by the non-dominant (usually left) hand and, with minimal or no contact with the horse's mouth. The finished animal is usually ridden in a curb bit and turned by use of the neck reining technique.  Inexperienced or "green" animals are usually ridden two-handed in either a snaffle bit or a bosal-style hackamore.
Western riding (horse show):  A competition seen as some horse shows where a horse in western equipment is required to perform a pattern that incorporates elements of reining, trail and western pleasure.

wheeler
One of the pair of horses closest to a horse-drawn vehicle (next to the wheels).  The only horses in a team able to slow the vehicle, by pulling back on the pole.  Also the rearmost of a team in tandem.  See leader.

whicker
See nickerwhinny or whinney
See neighwhorl
A circular arrangement of hairs, usually on a horse's neck. Their location is one means of horse identification.

wild horse
Horses that have no domesticated ancestors.Whitaker, et al. The Horse p. 24 Currently the only wild horse in the world is the Przewalski's horse.  The only other true wild horse to survive into historical times was the tarpan.  All other free-roaming horses today are feral horses, descended from domesticated ancestors. The Domestic Horse, Equus ferus caballus, is a subspecies of the Wild Horse.

win
In horse racing, the horse that comes in first in a given race.  Also a bet that a horse will come in first.

XXenophonAncient Greek cavalry officer, historian and political philosopher who wrote a manual, On Horsemanship'' (Ἱππαρχικὸς ἢ περὶ ἱππικῆς) describing humane methods for the training of horses, circa 350 BC.  Sometimes called the "father of classical horsemanship".

Y

Z
zebroid or zebra mule
Hybrid offspring of a zebra crossed on another equine, term includes the zorse, zony and zedonk.

See Also
For additional terminology, see also:
Equine anatomy (includes definitions and illustration of the points of a horse)
Equine coat color (lists all coat colors)
Equine conformation (includes terms that describe conformation flaws)
Horse breeding (explains relevant concepts)
List of horse breeds (includes horse breeds and types)

Horse racing:
Glossary of Australian and New Zealand punting
Glossary of North American horse racing

Equipment:
Bridle (includes a list of bridle parts)
Horse tack (horse equipment)
Horse harness (includes a list of harness parts)
Horse grooming (includes list of tools)
Saddle (includes a list of saddle parts)

Notes

Sources
 
 
 
 

 
 
 
 
 
 
 
 
 
 
 
 

.
Glossary
Equestrian
Equestrian
Wikipedia glossaries using description lists